Alto de Pinheiros is a district in the subprefecture of Pinheiros of the West Zone of São Paulo, Brazil.

Districts of São Paulo